The whiptail stingrays are a family, the Dasyatidae, of rays in the order Myliobatiformes. They are found worldwide in tropical to temperate marine waters, and a number of species have also penetrated into fresh water in Africa, Asia, and Australia. Members of this family have flattened pectoral fin discs that range from oval to diamond-like in shape. Their common name comes from their whip-like tails, which are much longer than the disc and lack dorsal and caudal fins. All whiptail stingrays, except the porcupine ray (Urogymnus asperrimus), have one or more venomous stings near the base of the tail, which is used in defense. In order to sting their victims, they jerk their tails as the stinger falls off and stays in the wound that they have created. The stinger of a whiptail stingray is pointy, sharp with jagged edges.

Genera
The taxonomy of Dasyatidae was revised by Peter Last, Gavin Naylor, and Mabel Manjaji-Matsumoto in 2016, based on morphological and molecular phylogenetic data. The placement of Megatrygon within the family is provisional pending further research, as evidence suggests it may be more closely related to the families Potamotrygonidae and Urotrygonidae than to other dasyatids.

 Subfamily Dasyatinae
 Bathytoshia Whitley, 1933
 Dasyatis Rafinesque, 1810
 Hemitrygon Müller & Henle, 1838
 Hypanus Rafinesque, 1818
 Megatrygon Last, Naylor, and Manjaji-Matsumoto, 2016
 Pteroplatytrygon Fowler, 1910
 Telatrygon Last, Naylor, and Manjaji-Matsumoto, 2016
 Taeniurops Garman, 1913
 Subfamily Hypolophinae
 Makararaja T. R. Roberts, 2007
 Pastinachus Rüppell, 1829
 Subfamily Neotrygoninae
 Neotrygon Castenau, 1873
 Taeniura J. P. Müller and Henle, 1837
 Subfamily Urogymninae
 Brevitrygon Last, Naylor, and Manjaji-Matsumoto, 2016
 Fluvitrygon Last, Naylor, and Manjaji-Matsumoto, 2016
 Fontitrygon Last, Naylor, and Manjaji-Matsumoto, 2016
 Himantura J. P. Müller and Henle, 1837
 Maculabatis Last, Naylor, and Manjaji-Matsumoto, 2016
 Pateobatis Last, Naylor, and Manjaji-Matsumoto, 2016
 Urogymnus J. P. Müller and Henle, 1837

Phylogeny

See also
List of fish families

References

Taxa named by David Starr Jordan
Extant Hauterivian first appearances